Lars-Åke Lindqvist (born 13 October 1959) is a Swedish rower. He competed in the men's coxless four event at the 1984 Summer Olympics.

References

1959 births
Living people
Swedish male rowers
Olympic rowers of Sweden
Rowers at the 1984 Summer Olympics
Place of birth missing (living people)